Supernatural High was Freda Payne's eighth studio album and her second for Capitol Records. The first track is a medley of two songs devoted to the subject of happiness - a cover of the old 1929 song "Happy Days Are Here Again" and an original song entitled "Happy Music (Dance the Night Away)."  The tracks "Pullin' Back" and "Livin' for the Beat" were co-written by Payne's then-husband, Gregory Abbott. "Storybook Romance" was written by Payne's younger sister, Scherrie. The first track and "I'll Do Anything for You" were two singles that were lifted from the album; they did not chart.

Track listing

Album credits
Produced by: Skip Scarborough for Relmare Productions, Inc.
Executive Producer: Larkin Arnold
Vocal Arrangements by: Skip Scarborough
Rhythm Arranged by: Skip Scarborough, Skip Scarborough and Sigidi for "Happy Days Are Here Again/Happy Music (Dance the Night Away)," Sigidi for "Falling in Love," and David N. Crawford for "I'll Do Anything for You"
Orchestra arranged and conducted by: David N. Crawford
Recorded at Capitol Recording Studio by David Cole (Mixing Engineer)
Mastered at A&M Records by Frank DeLuna

Musicians
Guitar: John Rowin (courtesy of Row-Char Productions), Louis Russell (courtesy of Epic Records)
Bass: Robert Russell (courtesy of Epic Records)
Keyboards: Ernest Straughter (courtesy of Epic Records), Michael Stanton, Skip Scarborough
Drums: Nate Neblett, Alphonse Mouzon (drums on "Pullin' Back," "Tell Me Please," and "Livin' for the Beat")
Percussion: Munyungo Jackson
Alto Saxophone Solo: Fred Jackson
Concert Master: Jerry Vincent
String Contractor: Jules Chaiken
Horn Contractor: George Bohanon
Background Vocals: Luther Waters (courtesy of Warner Bros. Records), Michael Wright (courtesy of Mercury Records), Dianne Wright (courtesy of Mercury Records), Scherrie Payne (courtesy of Motown Records)
Production Assistant: Sigidi Abdallah
Production Assistance: Greg Abbott
Project Coordinator: Yvonne Brooks
Very special thanks to the Recording Staff (Dave Cook, John Kraus, Marilyn Cheek, and Don Henderson)
Art Direction: Roy Kohara
Photography: Charles W. Bush
Make-up: Bjorn
Hair-stylist: Daley Henderson
Wardrobe: Bruce Halperin

References

1978 albums
Capitol Records albums
Freda Payne albums